Tabori or Tábori is a Hungarian surname. Notable people with the surname include:

George Tabori (1914–2007), Hungarian writer and theatre director
Ildiko Tabori (born 1971), American psychologist
Kristoffer Tabori (born 1952), American actor and television director
László Tábori (1931–2018), Hungarian-American athlete
Lena Tabori, American publisher
Paul Tabori (1908–1974), Hungarian author and journalist
Peter Tabori (born 1940), British architect
Róbert Tábori (1855–1906), Hungarian author

Hungarian-language surnames